38 Baby 2 is a mixtape by American rapper YoungBoy Never Broke Again. It was released on April 24, 2020, by Never Broke Again and Atlantic Records. It features YoungBoy's mother Sherhonda Gaulden and American rapper DaBaby.

The mixtape debuted at number one on the US Billboard 200 chart, earning 67,000 album-equivalent units in its first week.

Critical reception

38 Baby 2 received generally favorable reviews from contemporary music critics. Kenan Draughorne from HipHopDX stated that "[YoungBoy Never Broke Again] brings all this pain and so much more to 38 Baby 2, but to middling effect." He continues by noting "Raw emotion leaps forth on just about every song," and "YoungBoy sounds tormented from the jump, and it’s apparent in each melody, inflection, and lyric on the album." The review was concluded as Draughorne stated, "He’s still churning out new music at a ferocious pace." Alphonse Pierre from Pitchfork began his review by stating that "[YoungBoy] follows in the footsteps of Louisiana legends like Boosie and Kevin Gates," as he "makes autobiographical rap that touches on pain, paranoia, and trauma." He notes that "the 20-year-old sings and raps in a choked voice that sounds like he wants to cry, but doesn’t know how," and that "Typically he’s hostile and unpredictable; it’s made his relationships the source of endless social media debate and it’s reflected in his purest love songs." Pierre concludes his review as he states "And now he’s not just another rapper who sings about pain, but the rapper who sings about pain."

Commercial performance
38 Baby 2 debuted at number one on the US Billboard 200 chart, earning 67,000 album-equivalent units (including 4,000 pure album sales) in its first week, according to Nielsen Music/MRC Data. This became Youngboy's second US number one debut and his fourth top-ten album. This mixtape also accumulated a total of 96.9 million on-demand streams of the set's songs during the tracking week.

Track listing
Track listing and credits adapted from Apple Music and Tidal.

Charts

Weekly charts

Year-end charts

Certifications

References

2020 mixtape albums
YoungBoy Never Broke Again albums
Sequel albums
Albums produced by Take a Daytrip